Wail may refer to:

People
 Wail al-Shehri (1973–2001), Saudi terrorist
 Wail Sulaiman or Wael Sulaiman (born 1964), Kuwaiti football player

Places
 Wail, Pas-de-Calais, Hauts-de-France, France

Music
 Black Wail, American rock band
 Blue Wail, album by pianist Uri Caine
 Dale's Wail, album by American jazz trumpeter Roy Eldridge
 Wail N Soul M, Jamaican record label

Other
 wail, the sound made by a siren (alarm)
 wail, a type of vociferation
 WAIL, American radio station

See also
 Whale